On August 11, 2022, Ricky Walter Shiffer, a 42-year-old man, attempted to breach the FBI's Cincinnati field office in Ohio, United States. Shiffer was wearing body armor and armed with an AR-15 style rifle and a nail gun during the attack. He fled the scene after being confronted and travelled to a nearby cornfield. A six-hour standoff with police ensued that ended when officers fatally shot Shiffer.

Prior to the attempted breach, Shiffer had taken part in the January 6 United States Capitol attack, and after the FBI search of Mar-a-Lago, he posted on Truth Social about his desire to kill FBI agents.

Background

On August 8, 2022, the Federal Bureau of Investigation (FBI) executed a search warrant at Mar-a-Lago, the personal residence of former U.S. president Donald Trump in Palm Beach, Florida. The search, which included opening a safe owned by Trump, focused on material Trump brought to Mar-a-Lago after he left the White House, which allegedly contains classified documents. Trump was at Trump Tower in New York City during the search.

Attack
At 9:15 a.m. on August 11, 2022, Shiffer attempted to breach the visitor screening facility of the FBI's Cincinnati field office in Kenwood, Ohio. While doing so, he fired a nail gun at law enforcement personnel and held up an AR-15 style rifle, causing an alarm to go off. Shiffer then fled to his vehicle and headed north onto Interstate 71, leading the Ohio State Highway Patrol on a pursuit across three counties.

At 9:29 a.m., Schiffer published an incomplete post on his Truth Social account @RickyWShifferJr.

Well, I thought I had a way through bullet proof glass, and I didn't. If you don't hear from me, it is true I tried attacking the F.B.I., and it'll mean either I was taken off the internet, the F.B.I. got me, or they sent the regular cops while...

During the pursuit, Schiffer exchanged multiple shots with the pursuing troopers. Schiffer eventually exited the highway onto State Route 73 and traveled east to Smith Road in Clinton County before stopping and beginning a standoff with the police.

After fleeing to a nearby cornfield in Clinton County, Ohio, Shiffer engaged in a standoff with police that lasted for six hours. During the standoff, Shiffer and officers unsuccessfully fired shots at each other. Police attempted to negotiate with him, but Shiffer refused to surrender.

In Clinton County officials issued a lock down for residents and businesses within a one-mile radius of the intersection of Smith and Center roads. An Ohio State Highway Patrol helicopter circled the scene.

At 3:45 p.m., police made an attempt to take Shiffer into custody. Shiffer then raised his gun at officers and was shot dead.

Perpetrator 
Ricky Shiffer was a 42-year-old Navy veteran at the time of the attack. He had lived in Columbus, Ohio prior to the attack and had previously lived in Omaha, Nebraska and St. Petersburg, Florida. During his time in the Navy he had top secret clearance and had been assigned to the  after enlisting in June 1998, where he was in charge of overseeing missile and torpedo equipment. He had been known to the FBI after being identified as a participant in the Capitol attack during January 6, 2021, although at the time it was determined that the gathered information showed no specific or credible threat.

Aftermath
The FBI said they were tracking violent threats made against federal agents on Gab and other social media platforms.

Interstate 71 was reopened several hours after Shiffer was killed.

Reactions
FBI Director Christopher A. Wray released a statement saying that violence and threats against law enforcement are dangerous and should be deeply concerning to all Americans.

Liz Cheney, the Republican congresswoman representing , said that she was ashamed to hear that members of her party were attacking the integrity of the FBI agents involved with the recent Mar-a-Lago search. Elaine Luria, the Democratic congresswoman representing , condemned the attempted breach and recent attacks on federal law enforcement.

Qasim Rashid, an American author and human rights lawyer, said that people like Shiffer had been radicalized by events like the Conservative Political Action Conference, which had recently used the slogan "We Are All Domestic Terrorists" to mock accusations of extremism. Seth Abramson, an author and attorney, blamed the leaders of the Republican Party for being complicit with incidents of stochastic terrorism.

Charlie Kirk, the conservative founder of Turning Point USA, said that violence against law enforcement should not be tolerated but also criticized the FBI for "playing victim" after raiding Donald Trump's house, which he referred to as a military occupation.

References

2022 in Ohio
Attacks in the United States in 2022
Attacks on buildings and structures in 2022
Attacks on buildings and structures in the United States
Attacks on government buildings and structures
August 2022 crimes in the United States
Deaths by firearm in Ohio
Failed terrorist attempts in the United States
Law enforcement in Ohio
Terrorist incidents in Ohio
Terrorist incidents in the United States in 2022
Federal Bureau of Investigation
Hamilton County, Ohio